The IMS/ASA Spring Research Conference (SRC) is an annual conference sponsored by the American Statistical Association (ASA) Section on Physical and Engineering Sciences (SPES) and the Institute of Mathematical Statistics (IMS). The goal of the SRC is to promote cross-disciplinary statistical research in engineering, science and technology. The topics broadly cover a wide range of research areas including design and analysis of experiments, uncertainty quantification, computer experiment, machine learning, quality control, reliability modeling, and statistical computing, with the applications in business, industry, environment, information technology and advanced manufacturing. The SRC also regularly has invited sessions organized by editors of the top journals including Technometrics, Journal of Quality Technology, and SIAM/ASA Journal on Uncertainty Quantification. The SRC has the tradition to support students and postdocs with scholarships to selected participants who present contributed talks or posters at the conference.

About every three or four years, the Spring Research Conference (SRC) and the Quality and Productivity Research Conference (QPRC) have a joint conference together as the Joint Research Conference (JRC). The QPRC is an annual conference sponsored by the American Statistical Association's Section on Quality and Productivity.

History
The SRC was the brainchild of  Jeff Wu and Vijay Nair. 
Its precursor was the 1992 IMS Regional Meeting-Special Topics in Industrial Statistics in Philadelphia, 
which was initiated by Jeff Wu and program co-chaired by Vijay Nair and Jeff Wu.
The inaugural conference was held in Chapel Hill, North Carolina, in June, 1994, with Dr. Rob Easterling as the program chair and Dr. Jerry Sacks as the local organizer.
The long-term welfare of the conference is handled by a conference management committee. 
The members of the first conference management committee were Drs. Vijay Nair (Chair), Jon Kettenring, Jerry Lawless, Jeff Robinson, Daryl Pregibon, and  Jeff Wu. 
The conference completed its 25th anniversary in Santa Fe, New Mexico in 2018.

Meetings During Pandemic
Due to the COVID-19 pandemic, the SRC 2020 was cancelled, which was originally planned to be hosted by the Department of Mathematics and Statistics at Oakland University in Rochester, Michigan from May 20-22, 2020. The SRC 2021 was cancelled again due to the COVID-19 pandemic. The SRC 2022 was organized as a virtual meeting on May 19-20, 2022.

Future Meetings
The SRC 2023 will be a in-person meeting and take place at  Banff Center on May 24-26, 2023.

Past Conferences

References

External links
Spring Research Conference on the Section on Physical and Engineering Sciences of ASA webpage

Statistical societies
Mathematics conferences
American Statistical Association